Paweł Chęciński (Pah-vel Hen-chin-ski) is a Polish pianist who settled in the United States in 1971.

Born in Łódź, Poland, Pawel Chęciński studied at the Fryderyk Chopin Music Academy in Warsaw. In 1971 Chęciński was awarded a Fulbright Grant to study at the Juilliard School. Chęciński received a special award in the Chopin International Piano Competition in Warsaw and was a prize winner in the Smetana International Competition in Czechoslovakia and the Sydney International Piano Competition in Australia.

He has widely performed both in the American concert scene and abroad, and has taught at the Pennsylvania State University, the University of British Columbia and the Roosevelt University’s Chicago College of Performing Arts, where he served as the institution's artist-in-residence.

References

Year of birth missing (living people)
Living people
Polish classical pianists
Male classical pianists
Cleveland International Piano Competition prize-winners
Musicians from Łódź
Sydney International Piano Competition prize-winners
Polish emigrants to the United States
Pennsylvania State University faculty
Roosevelt University faculty
21st-century classical pianists